Odfjell is a Norwegian company.

Odfjell may also refer to:

 Odfjell Drilling, international drilling, well service and engineering company
 Abraham Odfjell (1881–1960), Norwegian ship owner